Ariel Maximiliano López (born 5 April 1974 in Lanús) is a former Argentine football player.

López played for Club Atlético Lanús Club Atlético Quilmes and San Lorenzo in his native country. He was transferred to the Argentine giant River Plate but the transaction was cancelled for a supposed knee injury.

In 1996, he was the top scorer in the Clausura tournament.

López has also played for RCD Mallorca and Hércules CF in Spain, as well as Genoa C.F.C. in Italy. Whilst at Mallorca he helped them to the 1999 UEFA Cup Winners' Cup Final, for which he was an unused substitute.

He finished his career, in 2007, playing for UNAM Pumas

External links
Ariel López – Argentine Primera statistics at Fútbol XXI 
BDFA profile 

1974 births
Living people
Sportspeople from Lanús
Argentine footballers
Argentine Primera División players
La Liga players
Serie B players
Liga MX players
Club Atlético Lanús footballers
San Lorenzo de Almagro footballers
Quilmes Atlético Club footballers
Hércules CF players
RCD Mallorca players
Genoa C.F.C. players
Club Universidad Nacional footballers
Argentine expatriate footballers
Expatriate footballers in Mexico
Expatriate footballers in Spain
Expatriate footballers in Italy
Argentine expatriate sportspeople in Italy
Argentine expatriate sportspeople in Mexico
Argentine expatriate sportspeople in Spain
Association football forwards